is the fifth studio album of Japanese singer songwriter Miho Komatsu. It was released on 25 September 2002 through Giza Studio label.

Background
Album includes previous 4 released singles, Todomaru koto no nai Ai, Saigo no Toride, Aishiteru and dance.

Re-arranged version of Style of my own appeared later in her 17th single Mysterious Love as b-side track.

Some b-side tracks previously released singles Aishiteru and Saigo no Toride were included in this album, such as Agaki and Ai no Uta.

The song commune with you appeared in her conceptual album Lyrics in 2003.

The single Todomaru Koto no nai Ai was included in the compilation album Giza Studio Masterpiece Blend 2001, however another songs such as Gift and dance were included in the compilation album Giza Studio Masterpiece Blend 2002.

Charting
The album reached #23 rank first week with 20,460 sold copies. Album charted for 3 weeks and totally sold 28,720 copies. This is first album which didn't enter to top 10 in Oricon rankings.

Track listing
All tracks are arranged by Yoshinobu Ohga (Nothin' but love) except of tracks #6 (by Daisuke Ikeda) and #7 (by Hirohito Furui (Garnet Crow).

Im media
dance
for Nihon TV program coupling with love as ending theme

References

2002 albums
2002 songs
Miho Komatsu songs
Songs written by Miho Komatsu
Giza Studio albums
Japanese-language albums
Being Inc. albums
Albums produced by Daiko Nagato